Harmandeep Palminder (born September 4, 1996) is a French actor of Punjabi origin.

Biography 
Harmandeep Palminder was born in a Sikh Punjabi family in Blanc-Mesnil but spent his childhood and adolescence in Aulnay-sous-Bois, in the Île-de-France.

He played the main role in his first film, Cyprien Vial's Bébé tigre. In the movie he plays the role of Many, a young immigrant from Punjab.

Filmography

Feature film 
 2014: Bébé tigre by Cyprien Vial
 2016: A Wedding (Noces) by Stephan Streker
 2018: Place Publique
 2019: New Biz in the Hood
 2020: Night Shift

Short film 
 2015: Tarò by Franck Marchal

References

External links 
 
 Harmandeep Palminder at CinéArtistes
 Harmandeep Palminder at Allociné
 Harmandeep Palminder at uniFrance

French male actors
1996 births
Living people